Moombra is a locality in the Somerset Region, Queensland, Australia.

Geography 
The locality is located on the north-western side of Lake Wivenhoe created by the Wivenhoe Dam across the Brisbane River. Although very close to the lake, the lake and its shoreline are within the locality of Lake Wivenhoe.

The Brisbane Valley Highway passes through the locality from south (Coominya) to north (Glen Esk).

The principal land use is cattle grazing.

History 
The name Moomba is believed to be the Waka language name for the land between Mount Hallen and the Brisbane River (now Lake Wivenhoe).

Following the closure of the Riverside Pine Mountain school, the Five Mile Water Provisional School opened on 19 February 1883. In February 1892 it was renamed Moombra Provisional School. It closed in 1905.

On 7 March 1910  Moombra State School opened but it closed in 1926 due to low student numbers. It reopened in 1928 but closed again in 1932.

Education 
There are no schools in Moombra. There are primary schools in neighbouring Esk and Coominya.

References 

Suburbs of Somerset Region
Localities in Queensland